is a Japanese manga series by Arata Aki. It was serialized in Media Factory's shōjo manga magazine Monthly Comic Gene from January 2013 to April 2020, and was collected in twelve tankōbon volumes. An anime television series adaptation by EMT Squared premiered from January 11 to March 28, 2020.

Characters

Media

Manga

Anime
An anime television series adaptation was announced in the October issue of Monthly Comic Gene magazine on September 15, 2018. The series is animated by EMT Squared and directed by Atsushi Nigorikawa, with Natsuko Takahashi handling series composition, Yuki Nakano designing the characters, and Kanako Hara composing the music. It premiered from January 11 to March 28, 2020 on AT-X, Tokyo MX, and BS Fuji, and is streamed by Crunchyroll. All at Once performed the series's opening theme song "Take mo' Chance", while AŌP performed the series' ending theme song . The series ran for 12 episodes.

Reception
The manga has over 460,000 copies in print.

References

External links
  
 

2020 anime television series debuts
Anime series based on manga
AT-X (TV network) original programming
Crunchyroll anime
EMT Squared
Media Factory manga
Shōjo manga